Lin Kegong (1901 – 1992) was a Taiwanese modern painter.

Biography 
Lin was born in Banqiao into the Lin Ben Yuan Family during Japanese rule. He was first educated in Hong Kong's St Stephen's College. From 1921 to 1925 he attended Cambridge University, studying law and economics and at Cambridge found that he had an interest in art.

He joined the Cambridge Arts Society when taking the alternative courses in the Cambridge Arts College at the same time. He even made use of his summer vacation to learn more about arts at St John's Service Arts College.

Upon his graduation as a Bachelor in 1925, he was officially admitted by the David Slade Arts College, London University. In the same year, his works were also accepted to the Royal Academy Exhibition in the U.K.

In 1931 Lin returned to Taiwan to hold his own exhibition. Afterwards, some of his works, including “The Naked Body” and “The Beauty Under the Moon” were selected to be part of the 5th and 6th section of the Taiwan Arts Exhibition.

In 1937, he was appointed as the Arts College headmaster. In 1949, Lin Kegong returned to Taiwan via Hong Kong. At Liang Dingming's invitation, Lin began his teaching career in the Arts College of Political Warfare School in 1956.

In 1973, he was a member of the jury of the São Paulo Art Biennial. In 1991 he received the Achievement Reward in the category of Culture and Arts by the Council for Cultural Affairs with.

Style of the Artist
Lin regarded music as an important part of creation. A great deal of Lin's works were inspired by his careful observation on the nature and his personal understanding in the relationship between the nature and the personal life.

Brushwork: similar to the Chinese painting; he attached much importance to the background. Before drawing the whole picture, he was used to sketch the background out. It was also by doing so that Lin was able to complete the structure of the picture in a whole.

Works of the Artist

Lin Kegong's “The Countryside in the UK” is his earliest extant painting. In this picture, a river in Bristow, UK is depicted. Attracted by light reflected by the river, Lin Kegong applied the perspective line disappearance method to show the near sight and the distant view. Then he showed the actual distance by means of the size of the crossing waterway and the bridge. In this picture, the leveling method is applied, as in watercolor painting.

The painting revealed the attic scenery of a European Building.

See also
Taiwanese art

Notes

Sources 
 Commercial Press. 2012. "Dictionary of Taiwanese History - Lin." http://nrch.cca.gov.tw/ccahome/website/site20/contents/008/cca220003-li-wpkbhisdict001525-0476-u.xml (accessed 4 10, 2013).
 Encyclopedia of Taiwan. 2010. "Lin Kegung." https://archive.today/20130708074407/http://taiwanpedia.culture.tw/web/content?ID=4682 (accessed 4 10, 2013)
 Kegong, Lin. 2012."Taiwan Teacher."  https://web.archive.org/web/20070823095452/http://www.taiwanteacher.tw/utt_cd1/e16.htm (accessed 4 5, 2013).
 Taiwan Art Museum. 2012 "Taiwanese Artists - Linkegong." .http://over.tngs.tn.edu.tw/arts/arts-004/arts-004-016/arts-004-016.htm (accessed 4 7, 2013). 
 視覺素養學習網. "林克恭". http://vr.theatre.ntu.edu.tw/fineart/painter-tw/limkackeong/limkackeong.htm (accessed 4 12, 2013)
 

Taiwanese painters
1992 deaths
1901 births
20th-century Taiwanese painters